The 2010 Formula Renault 2.0 UK Championship was the 22nd British Formula Renault Championship. The season began at Thruxton on 3 April and ended on 10 October at Brands Hatch, after twenty rounds held in England, and for the first time since 2006, Scotland. Making its debut in the series in 2010 was the new-specification car, designed by Barazi-Epsilon, replacing the Tatuus chassis that had been in the series since 2000.

Despite winning just three races – coming in succession at Silverstone National and Knockhill – Blomqvist won the championship due to his superior finishing record, finishing 19 of the season's 20 races within the top seven placings; giving Fortec their third title in the last four seasons. Lewis Williamson of Manor Competition finished the season as runner-up behind Blomqvist, 14 points behind on overall scores, but was eight points closer on the series' championship system in which a driver's two worst scores are not considered towards the championship. Williamson took five victories during the season, but mistakes at Brands Hatch when he spun out of the lead while leading the race and a poor start in the final race, as well as errors at Croft prevented him from becoming Manor's second successive champion after Dean Smith's triumph in 2009.

Also in the running for the championship at the final Brands Hatch meeting were Atech GP's Tamás Pál Kiss and Williamson's Manor teammate Will Stevens, but poor results for both drivers in the first race mathematically eliminated them from contention. Pál Kiss had started the season strongly, having finished on the podium in six of the first seven races with three victories but failed to reach the top step of the podium in any of the remaining races, taking just two further podiums en route to third place in the championship. Stevens took fourth in the championship finishing nine points behind Pál Kiss on overall scores and 20 on dropped scores after finishing every race of the season including victories at Thruxton and the Brands Hatch GP meeting. CRS Racing's top driver was Harry Tincknell, who finished fifth in the championship with victories at Rockingham and Snetterton.

Five other drivers tasted success during the season, with only Riki Christodoulou not finishing within the top ten of the championship, due to him not partaking in the full campaign. Ollie Millroy was another winner for Manor, when he won from pole position at Snetterton, Pál Kiss' Atech GP teammates Nick Yelloly and Marlon Stöckinger each won races at Brands Hatch and Croft respectively, Christodoulou won the season finale at Brands Hatch for Fortec, while CRS Racing's Robert Foster-Jones won at Knockhill before retiring at the end of the season, aged just 20 years old. In other championships, Alex Lynn bested Fabio Gamberini for Graduate Cup honours for first-year drivers, while Manor Competition comfortable won the Entrants' Championship by 96 points.

Teams and drivers

Calendar
The series supported the British Touring Car Championship at all rounds except Donington Park on 19 September, as Formula Renault formed part of the World Series by Renault meeting on the same date, at Silverstone.

Notes:
1. – The first race at Brands Hatch was cancelled due to bad weather conditions. As a result, the race was run at the Silverstone round of the championship, with grid positions standing for the race.

Standings

Drivers' Championship
 Points were awarded on a 32–28–25–22–20–18–16–14–12–11–10–9–8–7–6–5–4–3–2–1 basis, with 2 points for fastest lap. A driver's 18 best results counted towards the championship, with Graduate Cup runners' best 15 scores counting for that classification.

Entrants' Championship

Formula Renault UK Winter Series
The 2010 Michelin Formula Renault UK Winter Series was the 13th British Formula Renault Winter Series. The series commenced at Snetterton on 6 November and ended at Pembrey on 14 November, after six races at three rounds held in England and Wales.

Fortec Motorsport again took honours for the Series, as main season Graduate Cup winner Alex Lynn won the title after winning three of the six races to be held. He finished 17 points clear of teammate Joni Wiman, who made his Formula Renault début during the series having competed in ADAC Formel Masters, and claimed a victory at Pembrey. Jack Hawksworth finished third in his first single-seater championship, having taken two podiums and five top-ten finishes in his first six races out of karting for Mark Burdett Motorsport. Atech GP driver Richie Stanaway and Oliver Rowland of CRS Racing claimed the remaining victories as they finished in fifth and seventh places respectively. With five class wins, Fortec's Josh Webster won the BARC Winter Cup for the Formula Renault BARC competitors.

Teams and drivers

Calendar

Championship standings

References

External links
 The official website of the Formula Renault UK Championship

UK
Formula Renault UK season
Renault 2.0 UK